Domodedovo Airport (IATA: DME, ICAO: UUDD), formally Domodedovo Mikhail Lomonosov International Airport, is an international airport serving Moscow, the capital of Russia. Domodedovo Airport is one of the four major Moscow airports, one of the largest airports in Russia, and the eighth-busiest airport in Europe. In 2017, it served 30.7 million passengers, an increase of 7.6% compared to 2016, making it the second busiest airport in Russia, after the main primary airport serving Moscow, Sheremetyevo International Airport.

In 2019, following a naming contest and a presidential decree, the airport was renamed after Russian scientist Mikhail Lomonosov.

History

The airport is named after the town of Domodedovo, on the territory of which it is located.

Survey work on the construction of the new Capital Airport began in 1948, after a decision by the Politburo. It was then described as special "Facility No. 306".

The Domodedovo Airport is located on the former territory of a village called Elgazino. The first mention of Elgazino dates back to the 16th century. In 1550, Tsar Ivan the Terrible gave his voivode and boyar Ivan Vasilyevich Sheremetyev a smaller estate in the Moscow district with 150 quarters of land. In 1627, the village appears again in the records and appears as a village of Elgozino on a pond with five peasant households, in the parish of the Church of the Resurrection in the village of Kolychevo. According to the results of the General Survey of the 1760s, the village already had 25 households and 218 inhabitants. In the 50s, just before the village was demolished, it had a population of about 200 people.

In 1951, preparatory work on construction began: cutting firebreaks, and construction of access roads, including roads from Paveletskaya.

A 1954 Resolution of the Council of Ministers of 13 November approved the proposal of the Main Directorate of the Civil Air Fleet under the Council of Ministers of the USSR on the construction of the second airport of the Moscow civil air fleet near the village Elgazin Podolsky (now Domodedovo) Moscow Oblast.

In 1958, a decree of the USSR Council of Ministers enabled completion of construction of the first stage of the airport in 1962.

In 1962, an Order of the Head of Main Directorate of Civil Aviation, issued on 7 April No. 200 ("On the organization of the Moscow Domodedovo airport") ordered "organize as part of the Moscow Transport Aviation Management Directorate the new airport, and continue to call it the Moscow Domodedovo Airport". Therefore, 7 April 1962 is considered the official birthday of the airport. By the end of 1962, after the official approbation, the airport began flights by postal and cargo planes.

Services from Domodedovo began in March 1964 with a flight to Sverdlovsk using a Tupolev 104. The airport, intended to handle the growth of long-distance domestic traffic in the Soviet Union, was officially opened in May 1965. A second runway, parallel to the existing one, was put into service 18 months after the opening of the airport. On 26 December 1975, Domodedovo Airport was selected for the inaugural flight of the Tupolev Tu-144 to Alma Ata.

In 1993–1994, East Line Group, founded by Urals entrepreneurs Anton Bakov and Dmitry Kamenschik, who built capital in the early 1990s by hauling cargo from Asian countries to Russia, invested in several facilities at Domodedovo, including a new customs terminal and catering services. In late 1996, Kamenschik-led East Line Group privatized the terminal facilities of Domodedovo Airport and formed JSC 'International Airport Domodedovo' and several other commercial entities controlling the airfield operations at the airport. Since 1998, the runways, air traffic control, and communication facilities have been formally on lease to a subsidiary of East Line Group. Later, in 2005 and 2008, the legality of these deals with East Line Group was contested by the Russian Rosimushchestvo government agency supervising the state property.

East Line's strategic goal to stabilize the airport's future and to establish Domodedovo as an important international and multi-modal transportation hub was gradually achieved throughout the 2000s. In the 2000s, East Line Group began to heavily invest in reconstruction and modernization of the outdated airport facilities.

In 2000, as a result of reconstruction, the capacity of the airport complex reached 6,000 passengers per hour: MVL – 2800 passengers per hour, DAL – 3,200 passengers per hour. As a result of this work Domodedovo airport terminal was the first in Russia to successfully pass the certification to ISO 9001:2000.

In 2003, the authoritative British magazine Airline Business recognized the growth in Domodedovo's passenger traffic as one of the highest among the 150 largest airports in the world. In 2004, the airport was among the top hundred of the leading airports in the world, and by 2005 became the leader in passenger traffic in the Moscow aviation area, a record it held for the next 10 years.

By 2009, the terminal floor space was expanded to 135,000 sq. meters (1,453,000 ft2) from 70,000 sq. meters (753,000 ft2) in 2004. The renovated terminal and airport facilities allowed the owners of the airport to attract British Airways, China Eastern Airlines, Lufthansa, Royal Air Maroc, Japan Airlines, Austrian Airlines, and Vietnam Airlines who moved their flights from another major international Moscow airport, Sheremetyevo Airport, to Domodedovo. Domodedovo topped Sheremetyevo Airport in terms of passenger traffic becoming the busiest airport in Russia. By 2010, the traffic at Domodedovo spiked to over 22 million passengers per year from 2.8 million in 2000.

Domodedovo is Russia's first airport to have parallel runways operating simultaneously. Since the air traffic control tower was redeveloped in 2003, Domodedovo can control over 70 takeoffs and landings per hour. By late in the 1st decade of the 21st century, the airport had five business lounges set up by individual airlines.

In 2003, the airport began an expansion program designed to obtain approval for wide-body aircraft operations. The runway, taxiways, and parking areas were enlarged and strengthened. In March 2009, it was announced that the approval had been granted, making Domodedovo Airport the first in Russia approved for new large aircraft (NLA) operations such as the Airbus A380. The approval signifies that its operations areas comply with size and strength requirements of ICAO Category F standards. The airport has ILS category III A status.

Domodedovo Airport has been the focus of two terrorist-related incidents. In 2004, Muslim suicide bombers managed to pass airport security, board two passenger planes, and carry out the bombings after departure from Domodedovo. Despite the heightened security measures taken after this incident, another suicide bomber attack occurred on 24 January 2011, when an Islamist militant entered the terminal building and detonated a bomb in the arrival hall. As a result, mandatory screening and pat-down practices have been introduced at the airport terminal entrances.

The identity of East Line's owners controlling the operations at Domodedovo Airport was vague with traces leading to offshore companies. However, in May 2011, Dmitry Kamenschik was disclosed to be the main beneficiary of East Line's assets. At that time, Domodedovo Airport contemplated IPO, however these plans were scrapped.

Future development
As of January 2016, new concourse extensions adjacent to the current terminal building are under construction. The construction is projected to increase the overall size of the passenger terminal to 225,000 m2. The extensions are opened in stages in 2012–2014. In May 2015, the new extension of terminal A (the main building) was finished, which contains new offices, an airport lounge and new passport control desks, and it differs by design compared to other terminal parts. All concourses will remain connected and plan to increase the efficiency of the airport operations and passenger connections by using ICAO and IATA transfer technologies. A new parking space was also finished, which can accommodate over 1500 cars.

Terminal 2
The first stage of Terminal 2 was built as part of the 2018 FIFA World Cup program, for international flights. When completed, the international flights operated at concourse B were all shifted to the new segment, which became the second segment of a new passenger terminal and is twice the size of Terminal 5 at London Heathrow – the equivalent of 61 football fields. An area of 235,000 sq. meters (2,529,000 ft1) (segment T2) was mounted to the left wing of the existing terminal. There are about 100 check-in counters, 40 self check-in kiosks, as well as special jetways for the world's largest passenger aircraft, Airbus A380. As a result, the total area of the passenger terminal (including the expansion of the current main segment T1) increased by more than double to nearly 500,000 square meters. It was designed by British company RMJM and uses the under-the-roof concept, which means that passengers from all flights will be serviced within a single terminal. One of Europe's largest air hubs – Amsterdam Airport Schiphol – operates under this concept. The construction was initially planned to be finished by March 2018, however, due to immediate changes in contractor, the construction was delayed significantly. During 2018, terminal staff worked only in specific arrival and departure zones for football fans, travelling with special fan-centered passports. The terminal was fully completed with all remaining parts left for work, in 2020.

Terminal 3 and Aeroexpress Terminal
Currently, the part of the airport terminal which is used as the entrance to the Aeroexpress platform is under reconstruction; the old platform is being demolished and shifted into the new one, with a temporary terminal which will operate during the reconstruction process. This is being done to connect two parking sectors on the right side of the railway line; construct a new bigger terminal; and to form another exit, direct from the baggage claim at domestic arrivals. Moreover, the path to the Aeroexpress platform is planned to be placed underground. This will help form the new Terminal 3, construction of which began in 2018, after finishing the construction of Terminal 2. The Aeroexpress Terminal was planned to be fully finished by the first quarter of 2018. According to the schedule, T-3 is planned to be bigger than T-2.

Airport facilities

Terminals

Domodedovo Airport has one terminal building comprising two separate concourses for domestic (and some former Soviet republic countries) and international flights. It has 22 jetways altogether. When Terminal 2 is completed, the number of jet bridges will rise to 33.

Duty-free shops 
Both concourses A and B contain Duty Free facilities, with a wider selection at concourse A, because of the international destinations served there. At concourse B the selection is narrower, because of the domestic destinations. The duty-free selection will be expanded after Terminal 2 commences operations. The contract for operating at the duty-free shops in Terminal 2 was won by Heinemann Duty Free.

Hotel 
In September 2017, a new hotel was opened inside the airport terminal ("Aerotel Express"). This allows passengers transiting through Moscow to stay at a hotel without exiting the terminal (previously transit passengers had to leave the terminal and use a shuttle van to access the nearest hotel). This was the first hotel inside an airport terminal in Russia.

Lounges 
There are several lounge facilities at the airport like the British Airways Navigator Club Lounge, the Austrian Airlines Business Class Lounge, the Swiss Airlines Business Class Lounge, the S7 Business Class Lounge, the Priority Pass Business Lounge and several more. Most of the Lounges can also be accessed with a Star Alliance Gold Member Card (or higher) or a Oneworld Emerald Card (or higher).

In December 2019, the OneWorld Alliance confirmed their plans of opening their first branded lounge relating to their 20th anniversary at Moscow's Domodedovo International Airport. Further details on the lounge and its opening date will be announced in 2020.

Airlines and destinations

Passenger

In response to Russia's invasion of Ukraine in February 2022, many countries have moved to ban Russian airlines from their air space and many countries ban airlines from flying in and out of Russian airspace. Other airlines from the European Union, North America, the United Kingdom, Switzerland, Norway, Iceland, South Korea, Japan, Hong Kong, Taiwan, Singapore and Australasia have indefinitely suspended their services to Domodedovo.

The following airlines operate regular scheduled and charter services to and from Domodedovo:

Cargo

Statistics

Annual traffic

Other facilities
 Russian Sky Airlines had its head office on the airport property.
 Transaero had its head office at Domodedovo Airport.
 When Domodedovo Airlines existed, its head office was on the airport property.

Ground transportation

Rail

The airport has a railway station with service to the Paveletsky Rail Terminal in central Moscow. The rail connection, which was completed in 2002, provides Aeroexpress trains (takes 45 min; coach class costs 470 rubles, business class costs 1,000 rubles), with two stops at Paveletsky Rail Terminal and Verkhnie Kotly railway station. 
Regular suburban commuter trains in the Paveletsky suburban railway line take 65 to 70 min and cost 99 rubles, but are infrequent during the day.

Bus
Connection to Moscow is served by bus 308 (ample luggage room) and commercial marshrutka minivans (more frequent departures): to Domodedovskaya of Moscow Metro Zamoskvoretskaya Line (#2). The fare is 150 rubles (eq. to 2 US$), travel time around 45 minutes.

Local buses 11, 26, 30 link to nearby towns and connect to the railway station in the Paveletsky suburban railway line at Domodedovo municipality.

Bus 999 is South-East bound and connects the airport to Bronnitsy, Kolomna and Ryazan.

Road
The airport has several long and short term parking lots. The terminal itself is accessed from the junction of Moscow Ring Road and Kashirskoye Highway via a designated 22 kilometer (14 mi) four-lane freeway. Licensed taxi, limo services, and car rental (Hertz, Avis, and Sixt) providers are available at the counters of the arrival hall. Uber, Gett, Yandex.Taxi offer flat-rate trips to anywhere in Moscow, booked via mobile app.

Accidents and incidents
On 5 December 1999, a cargo variant of the Ilyushin Il-114 crashed during a test flight at Domodedovo, killing five and injuring two.
On 24 August 2004, Volga-AviaExpress Flight 1353, and Siberia Airlines Flight 1047 were simultaneously bombed, killing 44 on the first, and 46 on the latter, for a total of 90 people killed in total.
On 22 March 2010, a Tu-204 operating Aviastar-TU Flight 1906, a ferry flight without passengers and with 8 crew from Hurghada, Egypt, crashed in a forest 2 kilometers (1.2 mi) away from the airport while trying to land in fog. There were no fatalities and the crew escaped the crashed aircraft on their own, but four of them were seriously injured.
On 4 December 2010, South East Airlines Flight 372 made an emergency landing at Domodedovo, killing two people and injuring 56.
On 24 January 2011, the Domodedovo International Airport was subject to a suicide bombing which killed 37 people and injured 173. A Chechen jihadist group, the Caucasus Emirate was found to be responsible.
On 11 February 2018, Saratov Airlines Flight 703, an Antonov 148 crashed shortly after takeoff killing all 71 people on board.

See also
List of the busiest airports in Russia
List of the busiest airports in Europe
List of the busiest airports in the former USSR

References

Citations

External links

 Domodedovo International Airport Homepage 
 Official account on Facebook
 Official account on Instagram
 Aeroexpress service 
 How to get to/from airport by Aeroexpress train
 
 

Airports built in the Soviet Union
Airports in Moscow Oblast
Airports established in 1964
1964 establishments in the Soviet Union